The Edgar Gilbert Sporting Complex is a sports complex in Molyneux, Saint Kitts and Nevis.

History
The complex is named in honour of Kittsian cricketer Edgar Gilbert, who was from Molyneux. The ground held its first major cricket match in January 2001, when the Leeward Islands played Jamaica in a first-class fixture in the 2000–01 Busta Cup. The following season West Indies B played Bangladesh A at the ground in the same competition, with both teams appearing as guests in the competition. Three further first-class matches were played there until February 2005, with the Leeward Islands appearing in two and West Indies B in one. The ground played host to two minor matches in 2011 which saw the Saint Kitts and Nevis cricket team play England Lions, with both matches drawn.

Records

First-class
Highest team total: 286 all out by Leeward Islands v Barbados, 2004–05
Lowest team total: 85 all out by Kenya v West Indies B, 2003–04
Highest individual innings: 105 by Ridley Jacobs for Barbados v Leeward Islands, 2004–05
Best bowling in an innings: 7-70 by Omari Banks for Leeward Islands v Jamaica, 2000–01
Best bowling in a match: 10-46 by Maurice Odumbe for Kenya v West Indies B, 2003–04

See also
List of cricket grounds in the West Indies

References

External links
Edgar Gilbert Sporting Complex at ESPNcricinfo

Cricket grounds in Saint Kitts and Nevis
Sports venues in Saint Kitts and Nevis